Linda Jenness (born 1941) was a Socialist Workers Party candidate for president of the United States in the 1972 election. She received 83,380 votes (vs. 47,169,911 for Richard Nixon), making her the 4th most voted for candidate.

Biography

Jenness was the party's candidate for Governor of Georgia in 1970.  She did not get on the ballot, because to get on, she would have had to collect 88,175 signatures, and the Socialist Workers Party didn't have enough members to collect that many signatures.  Jenness, the SWP and two congressional candidates of the party brought a lawsuit, Jenness v. Fortson, 403 U.S. 431 (1971), regarding Georgia's ballot access standards, a case about which a supporter of the SWP has said it "continues to haunt the jurisprudence of ballot access law" (Raskin 2003, page 103).

She was also involved in the case 26 F.C.C.2d 485 (1970), regarding media coverage of third-party candidates.

In 1972, Jenness, Vice Presidential candidate Andrew Pulley, and People's Party candidates Benjamin Spock and Julius Hobson wrote to Major General Bert A. David, commanding officer of Fort Dix in New Jersey asking for permission to distribute campaign literature and to hold an election-related campaign meeting.  Based on Fort Dix regulations 210-26 and 210-27, General David refused the request.  Ultimately the case made its way to the United States Supreme Court (424 U.S. 828—Greer, Commander, Fort Dix Military Reservation, et al., v. Spock et al., which ruled against the plaintiffs).

Aged 31 at time of the election, she did not meet the Constitutional age requirement to hold the office of President, but the SWP was on the ballot in 25 states—six more than in 1968. She qualified for the Ohio ballot but was removed when she could not prove she was 35.

As of September 2010, Linda Jenness was still an active supporter of the SWP. Jenness is also a feminist. In the April 27, 1973 issue of Militant, she wrote that feminism "is where women are out fighting for things that are in their interest. Feminism is wherever women are challenging the traditional roles assigned to them."

Books
Linda Jenness has authored several books and pamphlets, or provided introductions.  Some of these are as follows:

 Jenness, Linda, and Fidel Castro (1970). Woman & The Cuban Revolution New York: Pathfinder Press.
 Jenness, Linda (1972). Socialism and democracy; a speech by Linda Jenness, Socialist Workers Party candidate for president, 1972. New York: Pathfinder Press 
 Jenness, Linda (1973). Feminism and Socialism. New York: Pathfinder Press 
 Jenness, Linda, and Andrew Pulley (1973). Introduction to Watergate: The View from the Left - Unpublicized Facts About Government Attacks on Dissenters and the Socialists; Strategy for Fighting Back New York: Pathfinder Press
 Jenness, Linda (1975). Last Hired, First Fired: Affirmative Action VS. Seniority

See also
List of female United States presidential and vice presidential candidates

Notes

References

External links
Interview in The Libertarian Forum 4, no. 12 (December 1972; mislabelled no. 10) (.pdf)
 Raskin, Jamin (2003). Overruling Democracy; The Supreme Court Versus the American People.
424 U.S. 828 -- Greer, Commander, Fort Dix Military Reservation, et al., v. Spock et al.
Results, 1972 American Presidential Election

1941 births
Living people
American anti–Vietnam War activists
Female candidates for President of the United States
People from Atlanta
American socialist feminists
Socialist Workers Party (United States) presidential nominees
Candidates in the 1972 United States presidential election
20th-century American politicians